Monoposthiidae is a family of nematodes belonging to the order Desmodorida.

Genera:
 Monoposthia de Man, 1889
 Monoposthioides Hopper, 1963
 Nudora Cobb, 1920
 Rhinema Cobb, 1920

References

Nematodes